Andhra Pradesh, retrospectively referred to as United Andhra Pradesh, Undivided Andhra Pradesh or Ummadi Andhra Pradesh, was a state in India formed by States Reorganisation Act, 1956 with Hyderabad as its capital and was reorganised by Andhra Pradesh Reorganisation Act, 2014. The state was made up of three distinct cultural regions of Telangana, Rayalaseema, and Coastal Andhra. Telangana was part of Hyderabad State formerly ruled by Nizam of Hyderabad, whereas Rayalaseema and Coastal Andhra were part of Andhra State which was formerly a part of Madras Presidency ruled by British India.

Creation of United Andhra Pradesh

In an effort to gain an independent state based on linguistic identity, and to protect the interests of the Telugu people of Madras State, Potti Sreeramulu fasted to death in 1952. As Madras became a bone of contention, in 1949 a JVP committee report stated: "Andhra Province could be formed provided the Andhras give up their claim on the city of Madras (now Chennai)". After Potti Sreeramulu's death, the Telugu-speaking area of Andhra State was carved out of Madras State on 30 November 1953, with Kurnool as its capital city. On the basis of the gentlemen's agreement of 1 November 1956, the States Reorganisation Act formed Andhra Pradesh by merging Andhra State with the Telugu-speaking areas of the already existing Hyderabad State. Hyderabad was made the capital of the new state. The Marathi speaking areas of Hyderabad State merged with Bombay State and the Kannada speaking areas were merged with Mysore State which was later renamed as Karnataka.

In February 2014, the Andhra Pradesh Reorganisation Act, 2014 bill was passed by the Parliament of India for the formation of the Telangana state comprising ten districts. Hyderabad will remain as a joint capital for not exceeding ten years. The new state of Telangana came into existence on 2 June 2014 after approval from the President of India. Number of petitions questioning the validity of Andhra Pradesh Reorganisation Act, 2014 is long pending for the verdict since April 2014 before the supreme court constitutional bench.

The Visalandhra, Vishalandhra or Vishala Andhra was a movement in post-independence India for a united state for all Telugu speakers, a Greater Andhra (Telugu: విశాలాంధ్ర Viśālāndhra). This movement was led by the Communist Party of India under the banner of Andhra Mahasabha with a demand to merge all the Telugu-speaking areas into one state. (The Communist Party of India demanded for the formation of similar linguistic states across India.) The movement succeeded and a separate state of Andhra Pradesh was formed by merging Telugu-speaking areas of Hyderabad State (Telangana) with Andhra State on 1 November 1956 as part of the States Reorganisation Act. (Andhra State had been previously carved out of Madras State on 1 October 1953.) However, on 2 June 2014, Telangana State was separated back out of Andhra Pradesh and the Vishalandhra experiment came to an end. The residual Andhra Pradesh now has approximately the same borders.

Governors of United Andhra Pradesh
Data from Andhra Pradesh State Portal.
Main article List of governors of Andhra Pradesh

List of Chief ministers of United Andhra Pradesh
On 1 November 1956, Hyderabad State ceased to exist; its Gulbarga and Aurangabad divisions were merged into Mysore State and Bombay State respectively. Its remaining Telugu-speaking portion, Telangana, was merged with Andhra State to form the new state of United Andhra Pradesh. 

N. Chandrababu Naidu of Telugu Desam Party was the longest served chief minister of United Andhra Pradesh. Kiran Kumar Reddy of the Indian National Congress was the last chief minister of United Andhra Pradesh.

List of Deputy Chief ministers of United Andhra Pradesh
The list of deputy chief ministers in the Indian former state of United Andhra Pradesh include:

Keys:

Creation of Telangana
After several years of protest and agitation, the central government, under the United Progressive Alliance, decided to bifurcate the existing Andhra Pradesh state and on 2 June 2014, the Union Cabinet unilaterally cleared the bill for the creation of Telangana. Lasting for almost 5 decades, it was one of the most long lasting movements in South India.[1] On 18 February 2014, the Lok Sabha passed the bill with a voice vote. Subsequently, the bill was passed by the Rajya Sabha two days later, on 20 February.[2] As per the bill, Hyderabad would be the capital of Telangana, while the city would also remain the capital of residual state of Andhra Pradesh for no more than ten years. At present, Hyderabad is the de jure joint capital. On 2 June 2014, Telangana was created.
Telangana movement
The Telangana movement refers to a movement for the creation of a state, Telangana, from the pre-existing state of Andhra Pradesh in India. The new state corresponds to the Telugu-speaking portions of the erstwhile princely state of Hyderabad.

See also 
Vishalandhra Movement
Jai Andhra movement
Telangana movement
Samaikyandhra Movement

Notes

References

1956 in India
History of Telangana
History of Andhra Pradesh (2014–present)
Rayalaseema
History of Hyderabad, India
Former states and territories of India